Acracy or acrasy may refer to:

Akrasia, the philosophical concept of an individual person's lack of self-control
Anarchy, the political concept of an absence of state control